APQ (subtitled The Maiden Voyage Sessions, Vol. 3) is a live album by saxophonist Art Pepper's Quartet recorded in 1981 at the Maiden Voyage nightclub in Los Angeles and released on the Galaxy label.

Reception

The AllMusic review by Ron Wynn stated "Hardly vital, but contains some solid solos".

Track listing 
All compositions by Art Pepper except where noted.
 "Mambo Koyama" - 11:36
 "Valse Triste" - 9:21
 "What's New?" (Bob Haggart, Johnny Burke) - 9:58
 "Landscape" - 11:04
Recorded at the Maiden Voyage, in Los Angeles CA on August 13, 1981 (tracks 2-4) and August 15, 1981 (track 1)

Personnel 
Art Pepper - alto saxophone 
George Cables - piano 
David Williams - bass 
Carl Burnett - drums

References 

Art Pepper live albums
1984 live albums
Galaxy Records live albums